Chotinan Theerapatpong (born 30 June 1992), simply known as Nan, is a Thai former professional footballer who plays as a right-back.

Club career
In 2019, Chainat Hornbill announced that he will retire from professional football at 26 years old to focus on a career in business.

External links 

 Profile at Goal
https://int.soccerway.com/players/chotinan-theerapatpong/288058/

References

1992 births
Living people
Chotinan Theerapatpong
Association football midfielders
Chotinan Theerapatpong
Chotinan Theerapatpong
Chotinan Theerapatpong